Viridifusus mollis is a species of sea snail, a marine gastropod mollusk in the family Fasciolariidae, the spindle snails, the tulip snails and their allies.

Description

Distribution

References

 Vermeij G.J. & Snyder M.A. (2018). Proposed genus-level classification of large species of Fusininae (Gastropoda, Fasciolariidae). Basteria. 82(4-6): 57-82

External links
 Sowerby, G. B., III. (1913). Descriptions of eight new marine Gastropoda mostly from Japan. Annals and Magazine of Natural History, Series 8. 11: 557-560, pl. 9.

Fasciolariidae
Gastropods described in 1913